Emil Farkas (born 1946) is an American martial arts instructor and writer known for his appearances in numerous films and in television shows.

Life 
Farkas was born in  Hungary in 1946. During the Hungarian Revolution of 1956, Farkas' father decided to escape Hungary  The family escaped through the border and went to a refugee camp in Vienna. Farkas later came to live in Toronto, Canada. He began training in the martial arts at a young age and he earned his black belt in Judo at age 17 and his black belt in Karate at 18.

His family moved to Los Angeles and Farkas studied at the California State University, Northridge. At age 22, he took a job as a bodyguard for Phil Spector. In 1970, Farkas founded his own dojo, the Beverly Hills Karate Academy where he has been teaching now for over 45 years. The dojo is now however closed as of 2023.  Farkas wrote the first script for a ninja movie, but the film was never produced. Farkas later became a stunt and fight coordinator for martial arts movies. Farkas  has co-authored and published books on martial arts. One of his ideas for a film sent to Robert Kosberg was used in the book How to Sell Your Idea to Hollywood to illustrate how "the sheer simplicity of an idea can be coupled with fortuitous circumstances-catapult[ed] an outsider into the Hollywood game."

Farkas has been on the cover and featured in many martial arts publications. In 1978, he was on the cover of Inside Kung Fu with the story "Emil Farkas vs. the Amazing Spiderman".

Farkas holds a eighth-degree black belt in Karate and is both a fourth-degree black belt in Judo and Jujitsu. He has been termed "Sensei to the Stars" for his martial arts training with celebrities.

Filmography 
Spider-Man Strikes Back (1978) 
Combat Shotokan (1989)
American Masters & Champions of the Martial Arts (2003)
Encyclopedia of Self Defense (2000)

Publications 
The Complete Martial Arts Catalogue (1977) 
A Woman's Guide to Self Defense (1978) 
The Overlook Martial Arts Dictionary (1981)  
Training and Fighting Skills (1980) 
Martial Arts : Traditions, History, People (1983) 
The Martial Arts Dictionary (1989) 
Mujeres, defiéndanse : no más víctimas indefensas : expertos les enseñan cómo dominar al agresor (English:Women Defend yourself: no more helpless victims: experts teach you how to master the aggressor) (1993) 
The Original Martial Arts Encyclopedia: Tradition, History, Pioneers (1993) 
The Original Martial Arts Encyclopedia: A Century of Martial Arts Worldwide (2011)

References 

American martial artists
1946 births
Living people